Les Misérables in Concert: The 25th Anniversary was performed and filmed at The O2 Arena in North Greenwich, London, England on 3 October 2010 at 1:30 pm and 7:00 pm. It marked the 25th anniversary of the original West End production of Les Misérables, which was based on Victor Hugo's 1862 novel, and has been running since October 1985.

Details

The 25th anniversary concert stars Alfie Boe as Jean Valjean, Norm Lewis as Javert, Lea Salonga as Fantine, Nick Jonas as Marius, Katie Hall as Cosette, Ramin Karimloo as Enjolras, Samantha Barks as Éponine, Mia Jenkins as Young Cosette, Robert Madge as Gavroche, Matt Lucas and Jenny Galloway as the Thénardiers, Hadley Fraser as Grantaire, and Earl Carpenter as the Bishop of Digne. Originally, Camilla Kerslake had been selected to perform as Cosette; however, she was unable to attend the concert. Hall was selected to play Cosette in her place. She had previously acted as Cosette at the Queen's Theatre from 2009 and in the 25th Anniversary Tour production at the Barbican. Casts of the contemporary London, international tour, and original 1985 London productions took part, comprising an ensemble of three hundred performers and musicians.  The orchestra was conducted by David Charles Abell, who also conducted the 10th Anniversary performance in Royal Albert Hall in 1995.

For the encore, four Jean Valjeans sang "Bring Him Home": Colm Wilkinson from the original London cast, John Owen-Jones from the 25th Anniversary touring production, Simon Bowman from the contemporary London cast, and Alfie Boe, who sang the role in the concert. The original 1985 cast (excluding David Burt, who had played Enjolras and states he can no longer sing the part and Patti LuPone who originated Fantine but was not in attendance) then led the ensemble in a performance of "One Day More". After speeches from Cameron Mackintosh, Alain Boublil and Claude-Michel Schönberg, the performance concluded with students from school productions of Les Misérables entering the arena through the audience and joining the casts for "The Finale".

The evening concert was shown live in cinemas across the UK, Ireland and around the world. The end credits of the concert confirmed a film adaptation of the stage musical for 2012 release.

A Blu-ray and DVD version of the O2 broadcast was released on 29 November 2010 in the UK (PAL DVD (Region 2) and Blu-ray). It was released in North America on DVD and Blu-ray on 22 February 2011.

The concert first aired on U.S. television as a PBS special on 6 March 2011.

Cast
Alfie Boe as Jean Valjean                                                     
Norm Lewis as Javert 
Nick Jonas as Marius
Katie Hall as Cosette    
Samantha Barks as Éponine                                                                                                                               
Lea Salonga as Fantine                                                                                                
Matt Lucas as Monsieur Thénardier                    
Jenny Galloway as Madame Thénardier  
Ramin Karimloo as Enjolras                                                                               
Alex Emery as Gavroche  
 Mia Jenkins as Young Cosette                       
Earl Carpenter as The Bishop of Digne
Hadley Fraser as Grantaire

Minor characters

 Chloe Panayi as Young Eponine
 Jonathan Williams as Combeferre/Convict
 Owain Williams as Feuilly
 Killian Donnelly as Courfeyrac
 Jamie Muscato as Joly
 Alistair Brammer as Jean Prouvaire
 Edward Baruwa as Legsles
 Cameron Blakely as Bamatabois
 Jeff Nicholson as Factory Foreman
 Grainne Renihan as Factory Girl
 Phil Snowden as Brujon
 Stephen Tate as Babet
 Tony Timberlake as Claquesous
 Keith Burns as Montparnasse
 Rhiannon O'Connor as Locket Crone/Old Paris Woman
 Valda Aviks as Hair Crone
 Peter Polycarpou as Pimp
 Chris Key as Army Officer
 Jay Bryce and Rhididan Marc as Constables
 Tony Whittle as Farmer
 Graham Gill as Labourer
 Gillian Budd, Zoe Curlett, Sara Pelosi, Amanda Salmon as Lovely Ladies 
 Nic Greenshields, Tom Pearce, Gerónimo Rauch, Mike Sterling as Convicts
 Gina Beck, Sophia Ragavelas, Jon Robyns, Gemma Wardle, Emma Westhead, Paul Westhead as Factory Workers
 Madalena Alberto, Gina Beck, Rosalind James, Lucie Jones, Sophia Ragavelas, Rebecca Seale, Gemma Wardle as Turning Women
 Antony Hansen, Jon Lee, Gary Watson as Sailors
 Lydia Griffiths as Madeline
 Jonathan Hart as Paris Pimp
 James Wren as Major Domo
 Vanessa Lee Hicks as Bishop's Sister

See also
 Les Misérables (musical)
 Les Misérables: The Dream Cast in Concert
 Les Misérables: The Staged Concert
 Adaptations of Les Misérables

References

External links
 

Concert films
Films based on adaptations
Films based on multiple works
Films based on Les Misérables
2010s English-language films
Films directed by Nick Morris